The lynching of George White occurred on Monday, June 22, 1903 in Wilmington, Delaware. White was a black farmer who was accused of the rape and murder of Helen Bishop, who was arrested and brought to the workhouse. On the evening of June 22, under the impression that the local authorities were not reacting severely or soon enough, a large mob of white men marched to the workhouse, broke their way in, and forced White out of his cell. He was then brought to the site of Helen Bishop's death, bludgeoned, had parts of his body dismembered, then was tied to a stake, and burnt to death. It is often referred to as the only documented lynching in Delaware, and as one of the worst crimes in Delaware history.

Background

National social climate 
The late 19th and early 20th centuries were times of high racial tension in the United States. This also coincided with a national pattern of racial violence. Between the years 1882 and 1921, the United States experienced more than 3,405 lynchings. Most of these victims were black men, but women and children were also targeted. While many people did not believe in lynching, others found them not only acceptable but necessary. These events were sometimes referred to as "unofficial executions." In 1903 specifically, there was a wave of lynchings across the midwest, including events in Evansville, Indiana, Springfield, Ohio, Belleville, and Danville, Illinois.

Local social climate 
These attitudes were especially complicated in Delaware. In his documentary "In the Dead Fire's Ashes," Stephen Labovsky describes the town of Wilmington as "North of the South but South of the North." This is because of its position as a border state during and after the U.S. Civil War. Scholar Michael J. Pfeifer describes this contradiction, saying "If the area's commercial interests were more aligned with...the industrial North, the state's social politics continued to reflect a Jim Crow orientation on matters of race and rights."

Events

Murder of Helen Bishop 
On June 15, 1903, 18 year old Helen Bishop was assaulted on her way home from Wilmington High School. Helen was the daughter of Reverend Bishop. She was found unconscious at around 5 PM near Price's Corner, West of Wilmington, by a man and his daughter. Her appearance was described as "soiled and torn," and she had wounds around her body, most significantly on her neck. Bishop was rushed home immediately, but died the following afternoon, never having woken up.

Town reactions 
Soon after the discovery of Helen Bishop, George White was arrested for the crimes committed against her. Though he did not fight the arrest, he did deny the claims. The evidence was circumstantial. White, who had two previous arrests, was described as a 24 year old laborer who was 5'9" and weighed 160 pounds. George Segars reported a man of that description running after Helen, who looked like she was rushing home. Two black women also mentioned seeing him walking behind Bishop that morning.

That same afternoon, hundreds of people went to Helen Bishops's public funeral, which showcased the grief of the family, especially the mother.  On June 21, 1903, a crowd of 3,000 gathered at the Olivet Presbyterian Church to hear Reverend Robert Elwood speak on the topic that he had advertised in the newspaper as "Should the Murderer of Miss Bishop Be Lynched?" Elwood spoke on the importance of quickly resolving the issue, and encouraged officials to take care of it before the citizens were forced to. To further agitate the crowd, Elwood brought out a container full of leaves, supposedly stained in Helen Bishop's blood.

Lynching 
The following evening of June 22, several hundred men and boys gathered and marched to the town's workhouse, where White was being held. The plan had been worked out over the past 24 hours. Outnumbering the guards, they stormed their way into the building and forced the guards to take White out of his cell. Many people were injured and the mob caused $400 in damage. They then brought White to Price's Corner, the same place as Helen Bishop's attack. Between 4,000 and 5,000 bystanders showed up to witness White being lynched.

Some of the men in the mob tied White to a stake and put straw at his feet. While tied up, White reportedly admitted to the crimes against Bishop. Extra straw was added at his feet and the stake was set on fire. White escaped the ties multiple times, jumping out of the fire only to be pushed back in. The third time he ran out, a member of the mob cut off his right foot, and another hit him in the head with a piece of a fence.

When the fire died down, it was reported that many men shot their revolvers into the ashes on the ground. At this time, many onlookers rushed to the stake and picked through the ash to loot pieces of White's bones, cloth, or other items to bring home as souvenirs. His foot and skull were at one point displayed in the window of a store in town. The coroner who went to the site found an alleged note from White, confessing to the crimes. It was covered in the same oil used to start the stake on fire.

Aftermath

Media coverage and public opinion 
The lynching of George White was covered extensively not just in Delaware, but around the country. This could be partially influenced by the number of lynchings that took place in the Midwest around this time. Many papers wrote entire editorials on the subject, including the Chicago Tribune, Washington Post, and St. Louis Post-Dispatch. Other pieces published pictures from the event, gruesome details, quotes by those who had witnessed it, and the transcript of White's supposed confession. Some scholars are wary of taking this as the whole truth, based on its "suspiciously clear and inflammatory" language."I was sent by MR. Woodward down to the cornfield to thin some corn, and I saw Mr. Woodward's daughter and intended to rape her, but a couple of men came along in a wagon and I didn't. Then I saw the Bishop girl and I followed her... I chocked her and accomplished my purpose. Then I asked her if she was going to tell on me, and she said she was. Then I gave her a hack in the throat with my knife...Then I went back to the house and put on a light hat instead of the cap I wore. You would not do this to me if I was a white man and did this." Most papers reported from a position that either sympathized with White, or that sympathized with the lynch mob. African American publications tended to land somewhere in the middle, being careful to show their displeasure with the mob and its actions while still condemning the actions of George White, assuming he was the guilty party.

Local opinion 
The town of Wilmington had two daily newspapers: the Morning News and the Evening Journal. Both of these were understanding of the town's frustration with officials for not acting quickly enough in the wake of Helen Bishop's murder. However, they did not agree with the violence of the mob. Nonetheless, neither paper mentioned the names of community members who were involved in the mob's action.

Helen Bishop's father himself was opposed to the mob activity and the lynching of George White, and had asked the town not to act illegally in response to the crimes for days before the lynching had actually happened.Papers also received countless letters from the public, explaining their opinions on the matter. Many people looked up to the mob, saying that they were local heroes and applauding their bravery. The Morning News  reported that the participants in this lynching believed "the job was done all right" and that "women will be safe now."

Others worried what would happen to the country if individuals were allowed to take justice into their own hands and at their own discretion. One example of this is Delaware resident Thomas F. Bayard, who said:"The action of the mob last night is a disgrace to the state. This is, and always has been, a law abiding community, and there never has been any question in the minds of those who chose to stop and think that exact justice would be meted out to all lawbreakers no matter how heinous the crime."The differences of these perspectives can be seen in comparing the beliefs of Robert A. Elwood and Montrose W. Thornton. Elwood was a Protestant reverend who argued that the lynching was justified due to the inadequate reactions of the town's courts and police. He was also known around town to be avidly opposed to gambling, drinking, and political corruption. Thornton was the son of former slaves and the first African American to graduate from Drake University. He spoke in the Bethel A.M.E. Thornton was against the mob, as he believed it signaled an end to American ideals like democracy. He also spoke about racial injustices, fighting against reconciliation and accommodation following the Civil War.

Legal action 
After the lynching, some people tried to determine who had been involved. In this case, the town described the "Avenging Cowboy," an unknown man on horseback, as the main leader of the mob. The focus on apprehending him was quickly forgotten, and the efforts dropped off significantly. Arthur Cornell of Baltimore was at one point arrested as the Avenging Cowboy. At first, his plea for bail was denied. Crowds began to gather and quickly turned violent when the mayor didn't respond to their demands to let Cornell go. He was eventually let out on bail, but the crowd did not disappear, and a number of men began attacking black people around the town. Many of those responsible for going after the members of lynch mobs such as these were sympathetic to their actions or participated themselves.

Modern mentions

In the Dead Fire's Ashes 
In the Dead Fire's Ashes is a documentary produced in 2004 by Stephen Labovsky. It was funded by the Delaware Humanities Council and has a run time of 40 minutes. The film focuses on the events leading up to, during, and immediately following White's lynching. It consists of interviews with historians, reenactments, old photographs, and voiceover, talking mostly about the series of events themselves.

Memorial plaque 
On June 23, 2019, the George White Commemorative Historic Marker was unveiled in Greenbank Park. It marked the 116th anniversary of George White's lynching. That same year in early August, the marker was stolen. A replacement marker, partially funded by citizens of the town, was unveiled on October 20, 2019.

See also
False accusations of rape as justification for lynchings

Notes

References 
 Labovsky, Stephen (2004). "In the Dead Fire's Ashes". YouTube.
 Williams, Yohuru R. (2001). "Permission to Hate: Delaware, Lynching, and the Culture of Violence in America". Journal of Black Studies. 32 (1): 3–29. ISSN 0021-9347.
 Pfeifer, Michael J. (2013-02-27). Lynching Beyond Dixie: American Mob Violence Outside the South. University of Illinois Press. .
 Hardy, Charles (2005). "IN THE DEAD FIRE'S ASHES: THE VIDEOGRAPHER AS HISTORIAN". Pennsylvania History: A Journal of Mid-Atlantic Studies. 72 (3): 305–312. ISSN 0031-4528.
 Delaware, Wm Shawn Weigel*. "Stolen marker recalling George White lynching to be replaced". Hockessin Community News. Retrieved 2020-02-19.

1903 in Delaware
Deaths by person in Delaware
Human trophy collecting
June 1903 events in the United States
Lynching deaths in the United States
People murdered in Delaware
Wilmington, Delaware